Naval Hospital Beaufort is a United States Navy hospital located in Beaufort, South Carolina.

History 
Commissioned on April 29, 1949, the hospital is one of only a handful of its kind that sits within its own complex rather than within a larger base.  It takes its name from Beaufort, the larger community north of Port Royal that is commonly associated with military installations in the Lowcountry region.

Function 
NH Beaufort serves nearby Marine Corps bases MCRD Parris Island and MCAS Beaufort, including the housing area of Laurel Bay.

References

External links 
www.nhbeaufort.med.navy.mil—Official Web Site

Medical installations of the United States Navy
Hospital buildings completed in 1949
Buildings and structures in Beaufort County, South Carolina
Hospitals in South Carolina
Military installations in South Carolina
Port Royal Island